The 2020–21 I liga (currently named Fortuna I liga due to sponsorship reasons) was the 73rd season of the second tier domestic division in the Polish football league system since its establishment in 1949 and the 13th season of the Polish I liga under its current title. The league was operated by the PZPN.

The league was contested by 18 teams. The regular season was played in a round-robin tournament. The season started on 28 August 2020 and concluded on 13 June 2021 (regular season). Each team played a total of 34 matches, half at home and half away. After the 17th matchday the league went on a winter break between 14 December 2020 and 19 February 2021. Due to the COVID-19 pandemic, the 110 matches have been played with a limited number of spectators. The rest of the matches (until 17 October 2020 and on 16 May 2021) were played behind closed doors without any spectators.

Changes from last season
The following teams have changed division since the 2019–20 season.

To I liga

From I liga

Team overview

Stadiums and locations
''Note: Table lists in alphabetical order.

 Due to the renovation of the Resovia Stadium in Rzeszów, Resovia will play their home games at Stadion Stal in Rzeszów. Originally they declared to play home matches at the Podkarpackie Centrum Piłki Nożnej in Stalowa Wola.

League table

Positions by round
Note: The list does not include the matches postponed to a later date.

The place taken by the team that played fewer matches than the opponents was underlined.

Results

Results by round

Promotion play-offs
I liga play-offs for the 2020–21 season will be played in June 2021. The teams who finished in 3rd, 4th, 5th and 6th place are set to compete. The fixtures are determined by final league position – 3rd team of regular season vs 6th team of regular season and 4th team of regular season vs 5th team of regular season. The winner of final match will be promoted to Ekstraklasa for next season. All matches will be played in a stadiums of team which occupied higher position in regular season.

Top goalscorers

Attendances

See also
 2020–21 Ekstraklasa
 2020–21 II liga
 2020–21 III liga
 2020–21 Polish Cup
 2020 Polish SuperCup

Notes

References

External link
 

I liga seasons
2020–21 in Polish football
Poland
I liga